Liang Yu (born 20 April 1994 in Tianjin) is a Chinese professional football player as a midfielder.

Club career
In 2013, Liang Yu started his professional footballer career with Shanghai Shenhua in the Chinese Super League. He would eventually make his league debut for Shanghai Shenhua on 26 June 2013 in a game against Changchun Yatai, coming on as a substitute for Bai Jiajun in the 85th minute.

On 10 July 2015, Liang transferred to fellow Chinese Super League side Henan Jianye.

Club career statistics 
Statistics accurate as of match played 31 December 2019.

References

External links
 

1994 births
Living people
Footballers from Tianjin
Shanghai Shenhua F.C. players
Henan Songshan Longmen F.C. players
Shenzhen F.C. players
China League One players
Chinese Super League players
Association football midfielders
Chinese footballers